Ollongren is a surname. Notable people with the surname include: 

Alexander Ollongren (born 1928), Dutch astronomer and computer scientist
Kajsa Ollongren (born 1967), Dutch-Swedish politician, daughter of Alexander